Great Slave Lake, known traditionally as Tıdeè in Tłı̨chǫ Yatıì (Dogrib), Tinde’e in Wıìlıìdeh Yatii / Tetsǫ́t’ıné Yatıé (Dogrib / Chipewyan), Tu Nedhé in Dëne Sųłıné Yatıé (Chipewyan), and Tucho in Dehcho Dene Zhatıé (Slavey), is the second-largest lake in the Northwest Territories of Canada (after Great Bear Lake), the deepest lake in North America at , and the tenth-largest lake in the world by area.

The lake shares its name with the First Nations peoples of the Dene family called Slavey by their enemies the Cree. Towns situated on the lake include (clockwise from east) Łutselk'e, Fort Resolution, Hay River, Hay River Reserve, Behchokǫ̀, Yellowknife, Ndilǫ, and Dettah. The only community in the East Arm is Łutselk'e, a hamlet of about 350 people, largely Chipewyan Indigenous peoples of the Dene Nation, and the abandoned winter camp and Hudson's Bay Company post Fort Reliance. Along the south shore, east of Hay River is the abandoned Pine Point Mine and the company town of Pine Point.

History
Indigenous peoples were the first settlers around the lake after the retreat of glacial ice. Archaeological evidence has revealed several different periods of cultural history, including the Northern Plano tradition (8,000 years before present), Shield Archaic tradition (6,500 years), Arctic small tool tradition (3,500 years), and the Taltheilei Shale tradition (2,500 years before present). Each culture has left a distinct mark in the archaeological record based on type or size of lithic tools.

Great Slave Lake was put on European maps during the emergence of the fur trade towards the northwest from Hudson Bay in the mid 18th century. The name 'Great Slave' came from the English language translation of the Cree exonym, Awokanek (Slavey), which they called the Dene Tha. The enslaved people were Dene tribes living on the lake's southern shores at that time. As the French explorers dealt directly with the Cree traders, the large lake was referred to as "Grand lac des Esclaves" which was eventually translated into English as "Great Slave Lake".

British fur trader Samuel Hearne explored Great Slave Lake in 1771 and crossed the frozen lake, which he named Lake Athapuscow. In 1897-1898, the American frontiersman Charles "Buffalo" Jones traveled to the Arctic Circle, where his party wintered in a cabin that they had constructed near the Great Slave Lake. Jones's story of how he and his party shot and fended off a hungry wolf pack near Great Slave Lake was verified in 1907 by Ernest Thompson Seton and Edward Alexander Preble when they discovered the remains of the animals near the long abandoned cabin.

In the 1930s, gold was discovered on the North Arm of Great Slave Lake, leading to the establishment of Yellowknife which would become the capital of the NWT. In 1960, an all-season highway was built around the west side of the lake, originally an extension of the Mackenzie Highway but now known as Yellowknife Highway or Highway 3. On January 24, 1978, a Soviet Radar Ocean Reconnaissance Satellite, named Kosmos 954, built with an onboard nuclear reactor fell from orbit and disintegrated. Pieces of the nuclear core fell in the vicinity of Great Slave Lake. Some of the nuclear debris was recovered by a joint Canadian Armed Forces and United States Armed Forces military operation called Operation Morning Light.

Suggested renaming

In the late 2010s, many placenames within the Northwest Territories were restored to their indigenous names. It has been suggested that the lake be renamed as well, particularly because of the mention of slavery. "Great Slave Lake is actually a very terrible name, unless you're a proponent of slavery," says Dëneze Nakehk'o, a Northwest Territories educator and founding member of First Nations organization Dene Nahjo. "It's a beautiful place. It's majestic; it's huge. And I don't really think the current name on the map is fitting for that place." He has suggested Tu Nedhé, the Dene Soline name for the lake, as an alternative. Tucho, the Dehcho Dene term for the lake, has also been suggested.

Geography and natural history

The Hay, Slave, Lockhart, and Taltson Rivers are its chief tributaries. It is drained by the Mackenzie River. Though the western shore is forested, the east shore and northern arm are tundra-like. The southern and eastern shores reach the edge of the Canadian Shield. Along with other lakes such as the Great Bear and Athabasca, it is a remnant of the vast glacial Lake McConnell.

The lake has a very irregular shoreline. The East Arm of Great Slave Lake is filled with islands, and the area is within the proposed Thaidene Nene National Park Reserve. The Pethei Peninsula separates the East Arm into McLeod Bay in the north and Christie Bay in the south. The lake is at least partially frozen during an average of eight months of the year.

To the east, McLeod Bay and Christie Bay are much deeper, with a maximum recorded depth in Christie Bay of 

On some of the plains surrounding Great Slave Lake, climax polygonal bogs have formed, the early successional stage to which often consists of pioneer black spruce.

South of Great Slave Lake, in a remote corner of Wood Buffalo National Park, is the Whooping Crane Summer Range, a nesting site of a remnant flock of whooping cranes, discovered in 1954.

Ecology
The Slave River provides the basin with high nutrient levels; accordingly, coupled with a general absence of pollution and invasive species, the lake is rich in aquatic life relative to its biome. Fish species include lake whitefish, lake trout, inconnu, northern pike and walleye, cisco, burbot, ninespine stickleback, shiner, also longnose sucker. Lake whitefish enjoy the highest levels, followed by cisco and suckers. Climate change, specifically reduced ice coverage times, are impacting the populations of these species. Copepoda are also prevalent in the lake.

Bodies of water and tributaries 
Rivers that flow into Great Slave Lake include (going clockwise from the community of Behchokǫ̀);

 Emile River
 Snare River
 Wecho River
 Stagg River
 Yellowknife River
 Beaulieu River
 Waldron River
 Hoarfrost River
 Lockhart River
 Snowdrift River
 La Loche River
 Thubun River
 Terhul River
 Taltson River
 Slave River 
 Little Buffalo River
 Buffalo River
 Hay River
 Mosquito Creek
 Duport River
 Marian Lake
 North Arm
 Yellowknife Bay
 Resolution Bay
 Deep Bay
 McLeod Bay
 Christie Bay
 Sulphur Cove
 Presqu'ile Cove
 Rocher River
 Frank Channel

Ice road

Great Slave Lake has one ice road known as the Dettah ice road. It is a  road that connects the Northwest Territories capital of Yellowknife to Dettah, a small First Nations fishing community also in the Northwest Territories. To reach the community in summer the drive is  via the Ingraham Trail.

Ice Lake Rebels
From 2014 to 2016, Animal Planet aired a documentary series called Ice Lake Rebels. It takes place on Great Slave Lake, and details the lives of houseboaters on the lake.

See also

List of lakes of Canada
Mackenzie Northern Railway

References

Further reading
Canada. (1981). Sailing directions, Great Slave Lake and Mackenzie River. Ottawa: Dept. of Fisheries and Oceans. 
Gibson, J. J., Prowse, T. D., & Peters, D. L. (2006). "Partitioning impacts of climate and regulation on water level variability in Great Slave Lake." Journal of Hydrology. 329 (1), 196.
Hicks, F., Chen, X., & Andres, D. (1995). "Effects of ice on the hydraulics of Mackenzie River at the outlet of Great Slave Lake, N.W.T.: A case study." Canadian Journal of Civil Engineering. Revue Canadienne De G̐ưenie Civil. 22 (1), 43.
Kasten, H. (2004). The captain's course secrets of Great Slave Lake. Edmonton: H. Kasten. 
Jenness, R. (1963). Great Slave Lake fishing industry. Ottawa: Northern Co-ordination and Research Centre. Dept. of Northern Affairs and National Resources.
Keleher, J. J. (1972). Supplementary information regarding exploitation of Great Slave Lake salmonid community. Winnipeg: Fisheries Research Board, Freshwater Institute.
Mason, J. A. (1946). Notes on the Indians of the Great Slave Lake area. New Haven: Yale University Department of Anthropology, Yale University Press.
Sirois, J., Fournier, M. A., & Kay, M. F. (1995). The colonial waterbirds of Great Slave Lake, Northwest Territories an annotated atlas. Ottawa, Ont: Canadian Wildlife Service.

External links

 "Perspective on the Great Slave Lake Railway" Manuscript at Dartmouth College Library

Lakes of the Northwest Territories
Tributaries of the Mackenzie River